Larry Hama (born June 7, 1949) is an American comic-book writer, artist, actor, and musician who has worked in the fields of entertainment and publishing since the 1960s.

During the 1970s, he was seen in minor roles on the TV shows M*A*S*H and Saturday Night Live, and appeared on Broadway in two roles in the original 1976 production of Stephen Sondheim's Pacific Overtures.

He is best known to American comic book readers as a writer and editor for Marvel Comics, where he wrote the licensed comic book series G.I. Joe: A Real American Hero, based on the Hasbro toyline. He has also written for the series Wolverine, Nth Man: The Ultimate Ninja, and Elektra. He co-created the character Bucky O'Hare, which was developed into a comic book, a toy line and television cartoon.

Early life
Hama was born June 7, 1949, in New York City. Growing up, Hama studied Kodokan Judo and later studied Kyūdō (Japanese archery) and Iaido (Japanese martial art swordsmanship). Planning to become a painter, Hama attended Manhattan's High School of Art and Design, where one instructor was former EC Comics artist Bernard Krigstein. He was in the same graduating class as Frank Brunner and Ralph Reese.

Career

Early career
Hama sold his first comics work to the fantasy film magazine Castle of Frankenstein when he was 16 years old, and he followed by collaborating with Bhob Stewart on pages for the underground tabloid Gothic Blimp Works. After high school, Hama took a job drawing shoes for catalogs, and then served in the United States Army from 1969 to 1971, during the Vietnam War, where he became a firearms and explosive ordnance expert. Hama's experiences in Vietnam informed his editing of the 1986-1993 Marvel Comics series The 'Nam. Upon his discharge, Hama became active in the Asian community in New York City.

High-school classmate Ralph Reese, who had become an assistant to famed EC and Marvel artist Wally Wood, helped Hama get a similar job at Wood's Manhattan studio. Hama assisted on Wood's comic strips Sally Forth and Cannon, which originally ran in Military News and Overseas Weekly and were later collected in a series of books. During this time, he also had illustrations published in such magazines as Esquire and Rolling Stone, and  Reese and he collaborated on art for a story in the underground comix-style humor magazine Drool #1 (1972). Through contacts made while working for Wood, Hama began working at comic-book and commercial artist Neal Adams' Continuity Associates studio; with other young contemporaries there, including Reese, Frank Brunner and Bernie Wrightson, Hama became part of the comic-book inking gang credited as the "Crusty Bunkers." His first known work as such is on the Alan Weiss-penciled "Slaves of the Mahars" in DC Comics' Weird Worlds #2 (Nov. 1972).

Hama began penciling for comics a year-and-a-half later, making an auspicious debut succeeding character co-creator Gil Kane on the feature "Iron Fist" in Marvel Premiere, taking over with the martial arts superhero's second appearance and his next three stories (#16-19, July-Nov. 1974). He went on to freelance for start-up publisher Atlas/Seaboard (writing and penciling the first two issues of the sword & sorcery series Wulf the Barbarian, writing the premiere of the science fiction/horror Planet of Vampires); some penciling work on the seminal independent comic book Big Apple Comix #1 (Sept. 1975); and two issues of the jungle-hero book Ka-Zar before beginning a long run at DC Comics.

At DC, Hama became an editor of the titles Wonder Woman, Mister Miracle, Super Friends, and The Warlord, and the TV-series licensed property Welcome Back, Kotter from 1977 to 1978.  He then joined Marvel as an editor in 1980.

Acting

Hama had a brief acting career in the mid-1970s, despite never having pursued the field. The casting director for the musical Pacific Overtures, Joanna Merlin, called Hama because an actor friend of his gave her his name when asked if he knew any other Asian actors. He told her that he had never acted before and could neither sing nor dance, but Merlin was persistent, and when informed that casting was less than a minute away from his workplace at Continuity Comics, he agreed to audition and was ultimately cast in three roles.

He also played a role in the 1976 M*A*S*H episode "The Korean Surgeon" and a Saturday Night Live spoof of Apocalypse Now. However, though he had made a living as an actor for roughly a year, Hama ultimately discarded his acting career, explaining, "I always basically saw myself as an artist, not as anything else."

G.I. Joe

Hama is best known as the writer of the Marvel Comics licensed series G.I. Joe, based on the Hasbro line of military action figures. Hama said in a 2006 interview that he was given the job by then editor-in-chief Jim Shooter after every other writer at Marvel had turned it down. Hama at the time had recently pitched a Nick Fury: Agent of S.H.I.E.L.D. spin-off series, Fury Force, about a special mission force.  Hama used this concept as the back-story for G.I. Joe. He included military terms and strategies, Eastern philosophy, martial arts and historical references from his own background. The comic ran 155 issues (February 1982-October 1994).

Hama also wrote the majority of the G.I. Joe action figures' file cards—short biographical sketches designed to be clipped from the G.I. Joe and Cobra cardboard packaging.  In 2007 these filecards were reprinted in the retro packaging for the G.I. Joe: A Real American Hero 25th Anniversary line.

Hama said in 1986 that G.I. Joe had an unexpected female following due to such strong female characters as Cover Girl, Lady Jaye, and Scarlett. (Scarlett's personality was actually based upon his wife)

"Most of the girls that write in [with letters to the comic] say that the reason they like the comic is that the women characters are simply part of the team. They’re not treated as any different from the other team members. They don't go around with their palms nailed to their foreheads. They’re competent, straightforward, and they go ahead and get the job done. They also participate emotionally. They have their likes and dislikes. They’re not ill-treated and they're not running around being worrywarts."

Hasbro sculptors sometimes used real people's likenesses when designing its action figures. In 1987, Hasbro released the Tunnel Rat action figure. The character is an explosive ordnance disposal specialist, whose likeness was based on Hama.

In 2006, Hama returned to his signature characters with the Devils Due Publishing miniseries G.I. Joe Declassified, which chronicled the recruitment of the squad's first members by General Hawk. In 2007, the company added the spin-off series Storm Shadow, written by Hama and penciled by Mark A. Robinson, which ceased publication with issue 7.

In December 2007, Hasbro released 25th-anniversary comic-book figure two-packs that featured original stories by Hama. These new Hasbro-published issues were designed to take place between the panels of the Marvel series.

In September 2008, IDW announced a new line of G.I. Joe comics with one series, G.I. Joe Origins, to be primarily written by Hama. He wrote the first five issues, as the series was originally intended to be a miniseries, and returned to write four more issues (including #19, which was a Snake Eyes "silent issue") over the course of the book's 23-issue run. IDW later revived the Marvel Comics continuity with Hama taking the helm of a new ongoing series, picking up where the Marvel series left off with issue #155 1/2.

Other work

At Marvel in the early 1980s, Hama edited the humor magazine Crazy and the Conan titles, and from 1986 to 1993, he edited the acclaimed comic book The 'Nam, a gritty Marvel series about the Vietnam War.

He also was an editor on Peter Porker the spectacular Spider Ham from 1983 - 1987

Hama wrote the 16-issue Marvel series Nth Man: The Ultimate Ninja (Aug. 1989 - Sept. 1990), concerning the adventures of John Doe, an American ninja and Special Forces commando in an alternate reality in which World War III is sparked after the world's nuclear weapons stockpiles are all destroyed. Hama also edited a relaunch of Marvel's black-and-white comics magazine Savage Tales, overseeing its change from sword-and-sorcery to men's adventure. Other comics Hama has written include Wolverine, Before the Fantastic Four: Ben Grimm and Logan, The Punisher War Zone, and the X-Men brand extension Generation X for Marvel; and Batman stories for DC Comics. He wrote filecards for Hasbro's line of sci-fi/police action figures, C.O.P.S. 'n' Crooks.

While working at Neal Adams' Continuity Associates, Hama co-developed a series he and comic book artist Michael Golden first created in 1978, Bucky O'Hare, the story of a green anthropomorphic rabbit and his mutant mammal sidekicks in an intergalactic war against space amphibians. Bucky O'Hare went on to become a comic, cartoon, video game, and toy line.

In 2006, Osprey Publishing announced that Hama had been commissioned to write for their "Osprey Graphic History" series of comic books about historical battles, including the titles The Bloodiest Day—Battle of Antietam, and Surprise Attack—Battle of Shiloh (both with artist Scott Moore) and Fight to the Death: Battle of Guadalcanal and Island of Terror—Battle of Iwo Jima (with artist Anthony Williams).

In February 2008, Devil's Due Publishing published Spooks, a comic book about a U.S. government antiparanormal investigator/task force. Hama created the military characters  and R.A. Salvatore the monster characters. He was also the writer of DDP's Barack the Barbarian series, a Conan the Barbarian parody starring U. S. President Barack Obama.

On September 19, 2012, Hama released his three-part vampire novel entitled The Stranger.

On December 17, 2012, Hama portrayed himself in a Christmas-themed episode of the Adult Swim series Robot Chicken.
In 2014, Hama began working with award-winning filmmaker Mark Cheng on an original film project, called Ghost Source Zero. The film was distributed by Sony Pictures in 2018.

In August 2014, Red Giant Entertainment announced that Larry Hama was writing the company's new Monster Isle monthly series debuting in November.

Bibliography

As writer
Avengers #326-333
 Bat-Thing #1
 Batman #575-581
 Batman: Legends of the Dark Knight #121-122
 Batman: Shadow of the Bat #90
 Batman: Toyman #1-4
 Before the Fantastic Four: Ben Grimm and Logan #1-3
 Cable #16
 Conan the Barbarian #117, 221, 224
 Conan #1-7, 10-11
 Convergence: Batman: Shadow of the Bat #1-2
 Convergence: Wonder Woman #1-2
 Daredevil #193
 Daredevil & Captain America: Dead on Arrival #1
 Detective Comics #736
 Echo of Futurepast #1-6 (Bucky O'Hare segments only)
 Elektra #14-19
 Generation X #33-44, 46-47
G.I. Joe (IDW) #0 (five-page story)
G.I. Joe: A Real American Hero (Marvel) #1-7 (6-7 - dialogue only), 10–19, 21–118, 120–142, 144–152, 155
G.I. Joe: A Real American Hero (Hasbro) #21B, 32.5, 36.5, 4-12
G.I. Joe: A Real American Hero (IDW) #155.5, 156-300
G.I. Joe: Battle Corps (Hasbro) #1-4 (with Paul Kirchner)
G.I. Joe: Declassified (Devil's Due) #1-3
G.I. Joe: Frontline (Devil's Due) #1-4
G.I. Joe: Order of Battle (Marvel) #1-4
G.I. Joe: Origins (IDW) #1-5, 8–10, 19
G.I. Joe: Resolute (Hasbro), #1-2, 4-6
G.I. Joe: Special Missions (Marvel), issues 1-23, 25, 27-28
G.I. Joe vs. Cobra (Hasbro), issues 1-6
G.I. Joe vs. Cobra (Fun Publications) #1 (with David S. Lane)
G.I. Joe: Valor vs. Venom (Hasbro) #7-10
G.I. Joe Yearbook (Marvel) #1-4
Iron Fist: Heart of the Dragon (Marvel) #1-6
 Kitty Pryde, Agent of S.H.I.E.L.D. (Marvel) #1-3
 Legends of the Dark Claw #1
 Marvel Comics Presents #25
 Marvel Graphic Novel: Wolfpack
 Marvel Holiday Special 1992
 Maverick #1
 Mort the Dead Teenager #1-4
 Onslaught Epilogue #1
 The Punisher War Zone #20-25
 Sabretooth #1-4
Snake Eyes: Declassified (Devil's Due), trade paperback (five-page story: "Silent Prelude")
 Spider-Man Team-Up #6
 Spider-Man: The Venom Agenda #1
 Spy Hunter & Paper Boy #1-6
 Star Wars #48
 The Stranger #1-3
Storm Shadow (Devil's Due) #1-7
 Team X/Team 7
 Unknown Soldier #211
 Venom: Along Came A Spider #1-4
 Venom: Carnage Unleashed #1-4
 Venom: Finale #1-3
 Venom: The Hunted #1-3
 Venom: License To Kill #1-3
 Venom: Sinner Takes All #1-5
 Venom: Tooth and Claw #1-3
 Venom: On Trial #1-3
 Weapon X #1-4
 Wild Thing #1-5
 Wolfpack #1-3
 Wolverine (vol. 2) #-1, 31–43, 45–57, 60–109, 111–118, Annual #1995
 X-Men: Age of Apocalypse One Shot #1
 X-Men Annual 1996
X-Men Legends #7-8 (Upcoming)
 X-Men Unlimited #9

As artist
 Daredevil (Marvel) #196 (pencil breakdowns)
 G.I. Joe: A Real American Hero (Marvel) #21, 26, 35 (partial), 36 (partial)
 Marvel Premiere #16-19

As writer and artist
Nth Man: The Ultimate Ninja (Marvel) #1-16 (story and cover layouts)
As editor

 Peter Porker the spectacular Spider Ham (Marvel) #1-17

Notes

References

External links

 

"JBL Interview with Larry Hama, Part One", JoeBattlelines.com, 2005, n.d.
Richards, Dave. "Hama Talks: G.I. Joe: Declassified",  Comic Book Resources, April 26, 2006
Pullen, Travis. "Interview with: Larry Hama", Filmfodder.com, March 31, 2009, | The Internet Archive's Wayback Machine copy of that interview 
Mitchel, Bill. "In-Depth: Larry Hama on G.I. Joe, The 'Nam and More", Comic Book Resources, June 3, 2009
Larry Hama interview, "The Comic Book Haters" podcast (2006), | The Internet Archive's Wayback Machine copy of that podcast

1949 births
Living people
United States Army personnel of the Vietnam War
American military personnel of Japanese descent
Place of birth missing (living people)
G.I. Joe
American writers of Japanese descent
People from Manhattan
Marvel Comics people
Marvel Comics writers
DC Comics people
High School of Art and Design alumni
United States Army soldiers
Inkpot Award winners